Qidiao Kai (born 540 BC), courtesy name Zikai or Ziruo, was a major disciple of Confucius. He declined to take government office, but started his own school, which developed into one of the eight branches of Confucianism identified by Han Fei. His work, known as the Qidiaozi ("Master Qidiao"), has been lost.

Life
Qidiao Kai was born in 540 BC, 11 years younger than Confucius. He was a native of the State of Cai. His original name was Qidiao Qi (漆雕啟), but the given name "Qi" was changed to the synonym "Kai" in Han dynasty texts because of the naming taboo of Liu Qi, Emperor Jing of Han. Two other members of his clan, Qidiao Chi (漆雕哆) and Qidiao Tufu (漆雕徒父), were also disciples of Confucius.

Qidiao Kai studied the Book of History from Confucius. In the Analects (5.6), Confucius asked him to become a government official, but Qidiao replied that he was not yet confident of his cultivation, and Confucius was pleased with his answer. There are several interpretations of this conversation. Confucius may have been pleased with his student's humility, with his disinterest in glory or government salary, or with Qidiao's assessment that the ruler at the time was not worth serving under.

Qidiao Kai later started his own school, which developed into one of the eight branches of Confucianism identified by Han Fei near the end of the 3rd century BC, but his doctrines are not known today. Yiwenzhi, the 1st-century imperial bibliography of the Book of Han, lists a 13-chapter book entitled the Qidiaozi ("Master Qidiao") attributed to Qidiao Kai, but it has since been lost.

Honours
In Confucian temples, Qidiao Kai's spirit tablet is placed in the outer court, beyond those of the Four Assessors and Twelve Wise Ones, and next to that of Shang Qu.

During the Tang dynasty, Emperor Xuanzong posthumously awarded Qidiao Kai the nobility title of Count of Teng (滕伯). During the Song dynasty, Emperor Zhenzong further awarded him the title of Marquis of Pingyu (平輿侯).

Notes

Bibliography

540 BC births
Year of death unknown
Disciples of Confucius
6th-century BC Chinese philosophers
Cai (state)
6th-century BC Chinese people
6th-century BC Chinese writers